Kitt is an unincorporated community in Jackson Township, Jay County, Indiana.

Kitt was formerly spelled Kit. A post office called Kit operated from 1880 until 1904.

Geography

References

Unincorporated communities in Jay County, Indiana
Unincorporated communities in Indiana